Tazlarovo (Taźlar) is a rural locality (a selo) and the administrative centre of Tazlarovsky Selsoviet, Zianchurinsky District, Bashkortostan, Russia. The population was 1,119 as of 2010. There are 25 streets.

Geography 
Tazlarovo is located 9 km southeast of Isyangulovo (the district's administrative centre) by road. Ivanovka is the nearest rural locality.

References 

Rural localities in Zianchurinsky District